Refka Hlaili (born 18 April 1990) is a Tunisian handball player. She plays for the club Sahel, and on the Tunisian national team. She represented Tunisia at the 2013 World Women's Handball Championship in Serbia.

References

Tunisian female handball players
1990 births
Living people